Cyclotorna monocentra is a moth of the family Cyclotornidae. It is found in Australia.

Life history
The first instar larvae begin life as parasites of leafhoppers in the family Cicadellidae and then move to the nests of meat ants, Iridomyrmex purpureus, where they complete their development by feeding on the ant larvae. Females of this species lay large numbers of eggs near the trails of the ants attending the leafhoppers. The first instar larva spins a pad of silk on the abdomen of the host beneath the wings, with a small sac at the anterior end to protect the larval head. Once the larva leaves the leafhopper, it builds an oval, flat cocoon where it molts into a broad, dorsoventrally flattened larva with a small head that can retract into the prothorax. It adopts a particular posture when encountered by a meat ant, raising the anterior half of the body and curling its posterior over its back to expose the anus. Following inspection, a meat ant will carry the larva into the nest, where it becomes a predator on the ant larvae. In the nest, the larva continues to produce an anal secretion that is attractive to the ants. Once the larva has completed development, which may take weeks or possibly months, it emerges from the ant nest, and spins its cocoon in a protected spot nearby.

References

Moths of Australia
Cyclotornidae
Moths described in 1907
Taxa named by Edward Meyrick